In mathematics, particularly computational algebra, Berlekamp's algorithm is a well-known method for factoring polynomials over finite fields (also known as Galois fields).  The algorithm consists mainly of matrix reduction and polynomial GCD computations.  It was invented by Elwyn Berlekamp in 1967.  It was the dominant algorithm for solving the problem until the Cantor–Zassenhaus algorithm  of 1981.  It is currently implemented in many well-known computer algebra systems.

Overview
Berlekamp's algorithm takes as input a square-free polynomial  (i.e. one with no repeated factors) of degree  with coefficients in a finite field  and gives as output a polynomial  with coefficients in the same field such that  divides .  The algorithm may then be applied recursively to these and subsequent divisors, until we find the decomposition of  into powers of irreducible polynomials (recalling that the ring of polynomials over a finite field is a unique factorization domain).

The algorithm focuses on polynomials  which satisfy the congruence:

These polynomials form a subalgebra of R (which can be considered as an -dimensional vector space over ), called the Berlekamp subalgebra.  The Berlekamp subalgebra is of interest because the polynomials  it contains satisfy

Berlekamp's algorithm finds polynomials  suitable for use with the above result by computing a basis for the Berlekamp subalgebra. If  then  is the coefficient of the -th power term in the reduction of  modulo , i.e.:

With a certain polynomial , say:

we may associate the row vector:

It is relatively straightforward to see that the row vector  corresponds, in the same way, to the reduction of  modulo .

By computing the matrix  and reducing it to reduced row echelon form and then easily reading off a basis for the null space, we may find a basis for the Berlekamp subalgebra and hence construct polynomials  in it.  We then need to successively compute GCDs of the form above until we find a non-trivial factor.  Since the ring of polynomials over a field is a Euclidean domain, we may compute these GCDs using the Euclidean algorithm.

Conceptual algebraic explanation

With some abstract algebra, the idea behind Berlekamp's algorithm becomes conceptually clear. We can assume that  is square free, by taking all possible pth roots and then computing the gcd with its derivative.

Now, suppose that  is the factorization into irreducibles. Then we have a ring isomorphism, given by the Chinese remainder theorem. By finite field theory,   is always the prime subfield of that field extension. Thus,  has   elements if and only if   is irreducible.

Moreover, we can use the fact that the Frobenius automorphism is -linear to calculate the fixed set. That is, we note that  is a -subspace, and an explicit basis for it can be calculated in the polynomial ring  by computing  and establishing the linear equations on the coefficients of  polynomials that are satisfied iff it is fixed by Frobenius. We note that at this point we have an efficiently computable irreducibility criterion, and the remaining analysis shows how to use this to find factors.

The algorithm now breaks down into two cases:

As  is small, we can cycle through all possible .

For further details one can consult.

Applications
Computing discrete logarithms is an important problem in public key cryptography and error-control coding. For a finite field, the fastest known method is the index calculus method, which involves the factorisation of field elements. If we represent the field  in the usual way - that is, as polynomials over the base field , reduced modulo an irreducible polynomial of degree  - then this is simply polynomial factorisation, as provided by Berlekamp's algorithm.

Implementation in computer algebra systems
Berlekamp's algorithm may be accessed in the PARI/GP package using the factormod command, and the WolframAlpha  website.

See also
Polynomial factorisation
Factorization of polynomials over a finite field and irreducibility tests
Cantor–Zassenhaus algorithm

References

 BSTJ Later republished in: 

Computer algebra
Finite fields
Polynomials factorization algorithms